Ladale Osagie Richie (born 30 July 1989) is a Jamaican international footballer who plays for Mount Pleasant Football Academy, as a central defender.

Club career
Born in Clark's Town, Richie has played club football for Village United, Montego Bay United and Mount Pleasant Football Academy. He served as captain of Mount Pleasant.

International career
He was first called up to the Jamaican national team in September 2015, making his international debut in 2016. In August 2017 new national team coach Theodore Whitmore announced his intention to utilise more locally based players, including Richie. in August 2018 he became the new national team captain.

References

1989 births
Living people
Jamaican footballers
Jamaica international footballers
Village United F.C. players
Montego Bay United F.C. players
Mount Pleasant Football Academy players
National Premier League players
Association football defenders
2017 CONCACAF Gold Cup players